Martin (Maarten Jan) Knottenbelt (12 March 1920, Batavia, Dutch East Indies – 19 August 2004, The Hague) was a Dutch citizen studying at the University of Oxford in England when World War II began. Knottenbelt enlisted in 1942 and served in a Dutch commando unit in Europe and the Pacific until he was relieved from his post in 1946. Knottenbelt was honorably discharged in 1960 from military service, and went on to become an anti-war activist, primarily in Europe and the United States.

References

External links
Martin Knottenbelt papers, 1970-1984 (bulk 1978-1982) Manuscripts and Archives Division, New York Public Library.

1920 births
2004 deaths
Dutch anti-war activists
Royal Netherlands Army personnel of World War II
People from Batavia, Dutch East Indies
Knights Fourth Class of the Military Order of William
Dutch people of the Dutch East Indies
Dutch expatriates in the United Kingdom
Alumni of the University of Oxford